Highland Society of Edinburgh may refer to:
 Edinburgh University Highland Society
 Royal Highland and Agricultural Society of Scotland